Carpenters is the third studio album by American music duo Carpenters. Released on May 14, 1971, it was their most successful studio album, reaching number two on the Billboard 200 chart and number 12 in the UK, as well as being certified 4× Platinum by the RIAA. The album contained the hit songs "For All We Know", "Rainy Days and Mondays" and "Superstar".

It has been said that the strength of these recordings is what caused Richard Carpenter to ask his sister to front the band for their live performances instead of playing behind the drums. Amongst many fans, the album has simply been referred to as "The Tan Album", because the original LP cover, complete with overlapping flap, looked like an oversized tan envelope, and is presumably a play on The Beatles' so-called White Album.

In Cash Boxs Top 100 Albums of 1971, Carpenters was listed as one of the year's ten biggest albums. This is the first album to feature the familiar Carpenters logo.

All lead vocals are by Karen, except on the tracks "Druscilla Penny", "Saturday", and the "Walk on By" segment of the Bacharach/David Medley, in which Richard Carpenter sings lead vocal, with Karen in the background.

The album and its singles earned Carpenters four Grammy Award nominations including Album of the Year. It won the Best Contemporary Vocal Performance by a Duo, Group or Chorus.

Critical reception

Bruce Eder of AllMusic gave the album a mixed review mocking the cover as, "a decorative picture of the duo (similar to a graduation photo)", also calling it very MOR, except for "Superstar". Similarly, Rolling Stone called the album "exceptionally sharp...MOR", calling "Rainy Days and Mondays", "Let Me Be the One" and "(A Place to) Hideaway" as more adequate than the other songs on the album, in spite of adding their prior album to their list of the 500 greatest albums of all time. They also proclaimed that, "the Carpenters have more going for them than against."

Songs

"Rainy Days and Mondays"

The music of "Rainy Days and Mondays" was composed by Roger Nichols, and the lyrics were written by Paul Williams, who later recorded his own version of the song. It was released as a single and charted well in the United States at number 2 on the Billboard Hot 100. "Rainy Days and Mondays" was the Carpenters' second Nichols/Williams hit, after "We've Only Just Begun" of the Close to You album the previous year.

"Saturday"
"Saturday" is a short, upbeat song with a runtime of 1:18. It was used as the B-side of "Rainy Days and Mondays". The song talks about how joyful Saturday is, and how joyful it is to finish Friday. In the 1973 TV special Robert Young with the Young, Richard and Karen performed "Saturday" and talked about its meaning. They also debuted their cover of the Sesame Street song "Sing".

"Let Me Be the One"
"Let Me Be the One" was remixed in 1991, with an extended beginning, end, and a different piano line. This remix can only be found on the From the Top box set. It starts with Richard counting off, and Richard's piano line is different from the original mix. The fadeout is also removed. The reason Karen stopped singing suddenly in this version is because she forgets the words, which is why she says something about "where I can figure out where the melody is, I'll sing it"...

Richard states he has little doubt the song would have been a hit if it was released as a single.

"Let Me Be the One" was a 1971 Easy Listening chart selection for Jack Jones.

"(A Place To) Hideaway"
"(A Place To) Hideaway" is a song originally written and composed by Randy Sparks, the founder of the New Christy Minstrels, songwriter, performer and owner of a nightclub in Westwood, Los Angeles, California. According to Richard Carpenter, Randy Sparks was the opening act for Richard Carpenter at his club in Westwood in late 1967-early 1968. Sparks had played "(A Place To) Hideaway" for the duo. Three years later, Richard remembered the tune and felt it would be suited for the album. The Carpenters performed it on their television series, Make Your Own Kind of Music on August 10, 1971 on a set where Karen wears a white and red ensemble with a dark blue background with a big letter "K".

"For All We Know"

"For All We Know" had been written and composed by Fred Karlin, James Arthur Griffin (credited as Arthur James), and Robb Wilson Royer (credited as Robb Wilson) for the film Lovers and Other Strangers. It was used during the wedding sequence, where it was sung by the relatively undiscovered Larry Meredith. The Carpenters released their version as a single in January 1971. Later that year, the Carpenters performed it on The Andy Williams Show, with Karen in a lacy outfit with a blue background. Although the song only peaked at #3 on the Billboard Hot 100, it still remains a favorite amongst many Carpenters fans. The video from The Andy Williams Show is not widely available, with the exception of snippets of their documentary, Close to You: Remembering the Carpenters.
Perhaps mainly as a result of the hit single, "For All We Know" went on to win an Academy Award for "Best Song". James [Arthur] Griffin and Robb [Wilson] Royer of the popular '70s soft-rock group Bread petitioned the National Academy of Motion Picture Arts and Sciences to use their real names on their awards, but to no avail, as the published composer credits are under their respective pseudonyms.

"Superstar"

Written by Bonnie Bramlett and Leon Russell, "Superstar" had been made popular by Rita Coolidge in 1970, but the Carpenters' version, released as a single in August 1971, became an international hit. In the liner notes for Gold: 35th Anniversary Edition, Richard writes that he saw Bette Midler singing the song on The Tonight Show Starring Johnny Carson, and felt that it would be a perfect fit for Karen's voice. Richard did have reservations about the lyrics, however, which he found a little too suggestive. After changing "I can hardly wait to sleep with you again" to "I can hardly wait to be with you again," he recorded Karen singing the song, reading the revised lyrics from a napkin. What wound up on the finished recording was the first time Karen had ever sung "Superstar". After only the first take, Richard claimed that her performance was "perfect" as it was, and did not need repeating.

"One Love"
The music of "One Love" was composed by Richard Carpenter, and the lyrics written by John Bettis, in the late 1960s, when both had jobs at Disneyland. It was originally called "Candy". On the television series Make Your Own Kind of Music, both Karen and Richard performed the song. Richard replaced the strings solo with a live piano solo for that performance.

Richard Carpenter remixed the song by adding a heavier bassline and refining the vocals, and it was released on 2003's Carpenters Perform Carpenter. The song was also released as the B-side of "I Won't Last a Day Without You" in 1974.

Track listing
All lead vocals by Karen Carpenter except where noted.

Personnel
Karen Carpenter – drums, vocals
Richard Carpenter – arranger, piano, harpsichord, Wurlitzer electric piano, Hammond organ, vocals, orchestration
Hal Blaine – drums
Jim Horn – reeds
Earl Dumler – oboe on "For All We Know"
Bob Messenger – bass, reeds
Tommy Morgan - harmonica on "Rainy Days and Mondays"
Joe Osborn – bass
Doug Strawn – reeds
Technical
Jack Daugherty – producer
Norm Kinney – assistant engineer
Dick Bogert – engineer
Ray Gerhardt – engineer
Guy Webster – photography
Roland Young – art direction
Bernie Grundman, Richard Carpenter – remastering at Bernie Grundman Mastering

Accolades

Grammy Awards

|-
| style="width:35px; text-align:center;" rowspan="4"|1972 || rowspan="3"| Carpenters || Best Pop Vocal Performance – Duo or Group|| 
|-
| Album of the Year || 
|-
| Best Engineered Non-classical Album || 
|-
| "Superstar" || Best Instrumental Arrangement Accompanying Vocalists ||

Charts

Weekly charts

Year-end charts

Certifications

References

1971 albums
The Carpenters albums
Albums produced by Jack Daugherty (musician)
A&M Records albums
Albums recorded at A&M Studios